Nipple is the seventh studio album by Dutch rock and roll band Claw Boys Claw. Coming on the heels of the commercially successful $uga(r), Nipple continues musically where the previous album left off, in the area of "swamp rock." The album was not a great commercial success, reaching #71 on 10 December 1994 on the Dutch album chart; the three singles that came from the album did not chart.

The CD was reissued in 2008, with three extra tracks, all of which had previously been released on the CD single "Call Me An Angel." "Get You Off (Brrr Mix)" is a remix, and "Sound Isn't Real" and "Sugarlite Blonde" were recorded at Pinkpop 1993.

Track listing

Personnel

John Cameron - guitar
Pete TeBos - vocals
Geert de Groot - bass, flute, backing vocals
Marc Lamb - drums, percussion
Luc Suèr - engineer, producer

Recording
Tracks 1-15 recorded at Luc Suèr's studio, Amsterdam, 1994; mixed at Orkater Studios, Amsterdam
Tracks 16 and 17 recorded live, Pinkpop 1993

References

See also
Claw Boys Claw discography

1994 albums
Claw Boys Claw albums
EMI Records albums